Bolo-Fouta is a rural commune in the Cercle of Yanfolila in the Sikasso Region of southern Mali. The commune covers an area of 171 square kilometers and includes 4 villages. In the 2009 census it had a population of 4,413. The village of Doussoudiana, the administrative center (chef-lieu) of the commune, is 38 km east of Yanfolila.

References

External links
.

Communes of Sikasso Region